Flora Brasiliensis is a book published between 1840 and 1906 by the editors Carl Friedrich Philipp von Martius, August Wilhelm Eichler, Ignatz Urban and many others. It contains taxonomic treatments of 22,767 species, mostly Brazilian angiosperms.

The work was begun by Stephan Endlicher and Martius.
Von Martius completed 46 of the 130 fascicles before his death in 1868, with the monograph being completed in 1906.

It was published by the Missouri Botanical Gardens.

Book's structure
This Floras volumes are an attempt to systematically categorise the known plants of the region.
15 volumes
40 parts
10,367 pages

See also
Historia naturalis palmarum

References

External links

Flora Brasiliensis in English

Brazil
Botany in South America
Flora of Brazil
Books about Brazil
1906 non-fiction books
19th-century Latin books
20th-century Latin books